The 53rd United States Colored Infantry was an infantry regiment that served in the Union Army during the American Civil War. The regiment was composed of African American enlisted men commanded by white officers and was authorized by the Bureau of Colored Troops which was created by the United States War Department on May 22, 1863.

Service
The 53rd U.S. Colored Infantry, also known as the 53rd Mississippi Colored Volunteers Infantry, was organized from the 3rd Mississippi Infantry (African Descent) on March 11, 1864 for three-year service under the command of Colonel Orlando Charles Risdon.

The regiment was attached to 1st Brigade, 1st Division, United States Colored Troops, District of Vicksburg, Mississippi, to October 1864. 1st Brigade, 4th Division, XVI Corps, to November 1864. Department of Arkansas to February 1865. District of Vicksburg, Mississippi, and Department of Mississippi to March 1866.

The 53rd U.S. Colored Infantry mustered out of service March 8, 1866.

Detailed service
Post and garrison duty at Haines Bluff, District of Vicksburg, Mississippi, until October 1864. Expedition to Grand Gulf March 12-14. Action at Grand Gulf July 16. Moved to St. Charles, Arkansas, on the White River October 1864, and duty there until February 1865. Action on White River, near St. Charles, October 22, 1864. Moved to Vicksburg, Mississippi, February 1865, and duty there, at Macon, Meridian, and other points in the Department of Mississippi until March 1866.

Commanders
 Colonel Orlando Charles Risdon
 Captain Edward Lyon Buchwalter

See also

List of United States Colored Troops Civil War Units
United States Colored Troops
List of Mississippi Union Civil War units

References
 Dyer, Frederick H. A Compendium of the War of the Rebellion (Des Moines, IA: Dyer Pub. Co.), 1908.
Attribution

United States Colored Troops Civil War units and formations
Military units and formations established in 1864
Military units and formations disestablished in 1866